Nip joints, found most commonly in Appalachia and similar areas where corn is grown in abundance, are venues where illegal liquor (i.e., moonshine)  is sold, often by the drink.  Most nip joints are located in residential areas inside homes.  The individual in charge is therefore referred to as the "House Man" or "House Lady".  Some nip joints have more amenities than others.

Government tax revenue 
By not paying the taxes levied on ethanol sold for consumption (and also typically not paying the taxes on their own income from the practice), moonshiners, bootleggers, and nip joint operators are able to make a significant tax-free profit. The enforcement of laws against bootlegging and moonshining is therefore necessary to protect a significant source of government revenue, as well as to provide a fair competitive environment for businesses that comply with the law.

In 2007, the U.S. federal government took in over $5.6 billion in taxes on alcoholic beverages. This government revenue source is protected by the law enforcement activities against those who do not pay the taxes.

As the government of the Commonwealth of Virginia put it, "a nip joint operation deprives the licensed restaurant owner of a legitimate source of income, and deprives the citizens of the Commonwealth and its localities of a legitimate source of tax revenues."

Public health 
Improperly produced moonshine can contain impurities (methanol) or adulterants that can be hazardous to public health.  Illness and deaths caused by moonshine in the United States are exceedingly rare, though underreporting is likely to be present in the statistics. In December 2011 it was reported that 168 people had died in India after consuming moonshine that had been improperly made and therefore contained high levels of methanol. The incidence of impure moonshine has been documented to significantly increase the risk of renal disease among those who regularly consume it, primarily from increased lead content.

See also 
 

Anaerobic respiration
Black market
Ethanol fermentation
Moonshine
Sin tax
Yeast

References 

Society of Appalachia